San Juan Cotzal is a town and municipality in the Guatemalan department of El Quiché. San Juan Cotzal is part of the Ixil Community, along with Santa Maria Nebaj and San Gaspar Chajul.

History

Pre-Hispanic era

Worried about the defection of the aj K’ub’ul family chief, who had taken his family away to look for fertile and, above all, Pacific land, the K’iche’ king sent a group of soldiers to control their movements. He was afraid that the aj K'ub'ul would look for reinforcements from other ethnic groups in the area to form a strong army and attack the K'iche's. The warriors settled to the east of the aj K’ub’ul and, since the K'iche's had moved away to look for an undisturbed place to settle, they were a peaceful community. The warriors informed the K’iche’ king as much, reassuring him that he had no reason to worry about the exiled group.

As time went by, the K'iche' warriors realized that the aj K'ub'ul life was very different from the one they were used to have under the ruling of their king, as they simply worked on their land and crops and then enjoyed their families without having to worry about being invaded or called to fight in a war. They went back to their place of origin, Tujalj (Sacapulas and Canillá), but only to pick up their families, and went on to settle a new community where they were once stationed to keep an eye on the aj K'ub'ul.

Campaigns in the Cuchumatanes

In the 10 years after the fall of Zaculeu, commencing in 1525, various Spanish expeditions crossed into the Sierra de Los Cuchumatanes and engaged in the gradual and complex conquest of the Chuj and Q'anjob'al. The Spanish were attracted to the region in the hope of extracting gold, silver and other riches from the mountains but their remoteness, the difficult terrain, and relatively low population made their conquest and exploitation extremely difficult. The population of the Cuchumatanes is estimated to have been 260,000 before European contact. By the time the Spanish physically arrived in the region, this had collapsed to 150,000 due to Old World diseases that had run ahead of them.

Uspantán and the Ixil

After the western portion of the Cuchumatanes fell to the Spanish, the Ixil and Uspantek Maya were sufficiently isolated to evade immediate Spanish attention. The Uspantek and the Ixil were allies and in 1529, four years after the conquest of Huehuetenango, Uspantek warriors were harassing Spanish forces and Uspantán was trying to foment rebellion among the K'iche'.

Uspantek activity became sufficiently troublesome that the Spanish decided that military action was necessary. Gaspar Arias, the magistrate of Guatemala, penetrated the eastern Cuchumatanes with 60 Spanish infantry and 300 allied indigenous warriors. By early September he had imposed temporary Spanish authority over the Ixil towns of Chajul and Nebaj. The Spanish army then marched east toward Uspantán itself; Arias then received notice that the acting governor of Guatemala, Francisco de Orduña, had deposed him as a magistrate. Arias handed command over to the inexperienced Pedro de Olmos and returned to confront de Orduña. Although his officers advised against it, Olmos launched a disastrous full-scale frontal assault on the city. As soon as the Spanish began their assault they were ambushed from the rear by more than 2,000 Uspantek warriors. The Spanish forces were routed with heavy losses; many of their indigenous allies were slain, and many more were captured alive by the Uspantek warriors only to be sacrificed on the altar of their deity Exbalamquen. The survivors who managed to evade capture fought their way back to the Spanish garrison at Q'umarkaj.

A year later Francisco de Castellanos set out from Santiago de los Caballeros de Guatemala (by now relocated to Ciudad Vieja) on another expedition against the Ixil and Uspantek, leading eight corporals, 32 cavalry, 40 Spanish infantry and several hundred allied indigenous warriors. The expedition rested at Chichicastenango and recruited further forces before marching seven leagues northwards to Sacapulas and climbed the steep southern slopes of the Cuchumatanes. On the upper slopes, they clashed with a force of between four and five thousand Ixil warriors from Nebaj and nearby settlements. A lengthy battle followed during which the Spanish cavalry managed to outflank the Ixil army and forced them to retreat to their mountaintop fortress at Nebaj.

The Spanish forces besieged the city, and their indigenous allies managed to scale the walls, penetrate the stronghold and set it on fire. Many defending Ixil warriors withdrew to fight the fire, which allowed the Spanish to storm the entrance and break the native defences. The victorious Spanish rounded up the surviving defenders and the next day Castellanos ordered them all to be branded as slaves as punishment for their resistance. The inhabitants of Chajul immediately capitulated to the Spanish as soon as news of the battle reached them. The Spanish continued east towards Uspantán to find it defended by 10,000 warriors, including forces from Cotzal, Cunén, Sacapulas, and Verapaz. The Spaniards were barely able to organise a defence before the defending army attacked. Although heavily outnumbered, the deployment of Spanish cavalry and the firearms of the Spanish infantry eventually decided the battle. The Spanish overran Uspantán and again branded all surviving warriors as slaves. The surrounding towns also surrendered, and December 1530 marked the end of the military stage of the conquest of the Cuchumatanes.

Population

According to an official census performed by the Guatemalan National Statistics Institute (INE), the municipality had a total population of 14,137 in 1994; in 2002 this grew by 42% and in 2008 a study determined that there was an additional 29% increase. The following tables show the difference population classification in San Juan Cotzal:

Dwelling

86% of the population owns their home, while the rest live in borrowed (12%) or rented (2%) houses. Most of the urban structures are made of zinc sheets roofing and brick walls. Rural area homes are built out of wood and 'teja', and lack any kind of flooring.

Occupation and salaries

Agriculture is by far the main productive activity of the area, and those who work their own land fare better income-wise.

82% of the population had an income of Q1,200.00/month, which was less than minimal wage at the time. Area development halted during the Guatemalan Civil War, although economic conditions were not all that prosperous even before it.

Education

San Juan Cotzal has numerous educational institutions: 22 of them are public schools run by the Government.

Economy

The production activity details are shown in the following tables:

Source: Grupo EPS, 2010

Climate

San Juan Cotzal has an oceanic climate (Köppen: Cfb).

Geographic location

San Juan Cotzal is 269 km from Guatemala City and 104 km from Santa Cruz del Quiché through the Quiché 6 West highway.

See also

 Guatemala Civil War
 Franja Transversal del Norte

Notes and references

References

Bibliography

External links
 

Municipalities of the Quiché Department